Interrupted Melody is a 1955 biographical musical film, filmed in CinemaScope and Eastman Color, directed by Curtis Bernhardt and starring Glenn Ford, Eleanor Parker, Roger Moore, and Cecil Kellaway. The film was produced for Metro-Goldwyn-Mayer by Jack Cummings from a screenplay by Australian soprano Marjorie Lawrence, Sonya Levien, and William Ludwig. It tells the story of Lawrence's rise to fame as an opera singer and her subsequent triumph over polio, with her husband's help. The operatic sequences were staged by Vladimir Rosing, and Eileen Farrell provided the singing voice for Parker.

Plot

The story traces Marjorie's (Eleanor Parker) long, hard road to the top, her success on two continents, and her turbulent marriage to American doctor Thomas King (Glenn Ford). While touring South America in 1941, Lawrence is stricken with polio, which not only abruptly stops her career but briefly robs her of the will to live. With her husband's help, she makes a triumphant return to opera and the concert stage, beginning by singing for hospitalized soldiers and troops overseas. She returns to the Metropolitan Opera, appearing in a full production of Wagner's Tristan und Isolde.

Cast
 Glenn Ford as Dr. Thomas King
 Eleanor Parker as Marjorie Lawrence
 Roger Moore as Cyril Lawrence
 Cecil Kellaway as Bill Lawrence
 Peter Leeds as Dr. Ed Ryson
 Evelyn Ellis as Clara
 Walter Baldwin as Jim Owens
 Ann Codee as Mme. Cécile Gilly
 Leopold Sachse as himself
 Stephen Bekassy as Comte Claude des Vignaux

Production

Development
In 1947 it was reported that Marjorie Lawrence was writing her memoirs, titled Interrupted Melody, and that she wanted Greer Garson to play her in a film. The book was published in 1950. The Chicago Tribune called it "engrossing".

In June 1951, MGM, which had just had a huge success with The Great Caruso, another biopic of an opera star, announced that it had bought the screen rights to the book. Jack Cummings was going to produce, and Kathryn Grayson was a possible star. Other possible stars were Greer Garson and Deborah Kerr, who would use Lawrence's voice. Lawrence flew to Hollywood in July to have discussions with Cummings and Sonya Levien, who was to do the script. In December, MGM announced Lana Turner would play the lead with filming to begin in February. However filming did not proceed. In July 1952, MGM said Garson would be playing the lead and William Ludwig was working on the script. By February 1953 the studio had postponed production again. In December 1953, the film was put back on MGM's schedule with Garson still attached.

On April 7, 1954, The New York Times announced that Eleanor Parker would play the part because all the other candidates, with the exception of Lana Turner, had left MGM. The article reported that Lawrence had recorded the songs for the film. Filming started in September 1954. According to Parker, the filmmakers could not use Marjorie Lawrence's voice, because she had lost her upper register. Parker could read music and had a firm soprano voice with perfect pitch. She prepared for the singing aspect of her role by listening to the numbers for weeks, and she sang them during the filming in full voice instead of lip-synching. The singing was dubbed by Eileen Farrell, who appears on screen early in the film, as a student struggling to hit a high note in a scene with the singing teacher Mme. Gilly (Ann Codee) .

Glenn Ford would only appear in the film if he got top billing. Parker says: "I wanted to do what was right for the picture, so I said: 'Let him have the top billing.' Glenn was a kind of a difficult man, but he was right for the picture and a very fine actor."

A key supporting role was given to Roger Moore, who had just made The Last Time I Saw Paris for MGM and had been put under contract to the studio.

Filming had finished by November 1954. The film was previewed in January 1955.

In February 1955, The New York Times published a photo spread showing scenes from the film.

Reception
According to MGM records, the film made $1,801,000 in the US and Canada, and $2,227,000 overseas, resulting in a profit of $101,000.

New York Times critic Bosley Crowther showered the film with praise.

Awards and nominations

Musical tracks
Walter Ducloux conducted the MGM Studio Symphony Orchestra. MGM published a selection of eleven numbers on an original motion picture soundtrack album.
 "O don fatale" from Verdi's Don Carlos
 Act 1 finale from Verdi's Il trovatore
 "Un bel dì" from Puccini's Madama Butterfly
 "Habanera" from Bizet's Carmen
 "Seguidilla" from Carmen
 "Mon cœur s'ouvre à ta voix" from Saint-Saëns' Samson and Delilah
 Brünnhilde's Immolation Scene from Wagner's Götterdämmerung
 Excerpts from Wagner's Tristan und Isolde
 "Annie Laurie" by Alicia Scott
 "Over the Rainbow" by Harold Arlen
 "Voi que sapete" from Mozart's The Marriage of Figaro
 Medley: "Anchors Aweigh" by Charles A. Zimmermann; "Marines' Hymn", based on works by Jacques Offenbach; "Don't Sit Under the Apple Tree" by Sam H. Stept
 "Quando me'n vo'" (Musetta's Waltz) from Puccini's La bohème
 "Waltzing Matilda", traditional

See also
 List of American films of 1955

References

External links
 
 
 
 
 
 Intro/outro to Interrupted Melody with Robert Osborne and Renée Fleming, Turner Classic Movies
 Original trailer

1955 films
American biographical drama films
Films about classical music and musicians
Films directed by Curtis Bernhardt
Films whose writer won the Best Original Screenplay Academy Award
Metro-Goldwyn-Mayer films
Films about opera
1955 drama films
Biographical films about musicians
Films scored by Adolph Deutsch
Films with screenplays by William Ludwig
Films with screenplays by Sonya Levien
Cultural depictions of Australian women
Cultural depictions of classical musicians
CinemaScope films
1950s English-language films
1950s American films
1950s biographical drama films